The Ukrainian Men's Volleyball Super League is the top men's league of Ukrainian volleyball. It was founded in 1992. It is run by the Volleyball Federation of the Ukraine (FVU).

Before, the Ukrainian teams played in the championship of the USSR, founded in 1933. During the seasons 1991/92-1999/00 called the Premier League. Between leagues at the end of each season, the teams exchanged - the worst two (one - directly, the second - in the case of unsuccessful performance in the play-off matches) are eliminated in the relegation - they occupy a place of lower league teams.

Teams

Ukrainian men's volleyball champions

Performance by club

See also 
 Ukrainian Women's Volleyball Super League

External links 
 Official website of the FVU
 Volleyball in Ukraine

Professional sports leagues in Ukraine
Volleyball competitions in Ukraine
Ukraine
Vol
Sports leagues established in 1992
Volleyball